John Hatfield (about 1795 – 27 April 1813) was a midshipman in the United States Navy during the War of 1812.

Hatfield was appointed Midshipman 18 June 1812 upon the outbreak of war. He volunteered for duty under Commodore Isaac Chauncey on Lake Ontario where he served in Lady of the Lake. Midshipman Hatfield was killed during the attack on York, Upper Canada, 27 April 1813.

Legacy
 was named for him.

References

1813 deaths
United States Navy officers
Year of birth uncertain
Year of birth unknown
United States Navy personnel of the War of 1812
American military personnel killed in the War of 1812